Iekeliene Stange (born 27 July 1984) is a Dutch fashion model.

Stange was scouted in Rotterdam during her college days. At the time, Stange was a multimedia design student.

Stange is signed with Women Management in Milan and Marilyn Agency in New York City. She has been featured in print advertisements for Marc by Marc Jacobs, Dolce & Gabbana and Sonia Rykiel. She has appeared in runway shows for Chloé, Chanel, Emmanuel Ungaro, Christian Dior, and Kenzo, as well as opening for Marc Jacobs' spring show.
Stange famously removed her shoes whilst opening the Marc Jacobs Spring 2007 show due to difficulty walking in them. Stange gave up on trying to maneuver the catwalk in slippery shoes, kicked off her sandals — to much applause — and continued the walk barefoot. It took fifth spot on the "Top Five Runway Falls" list by New York Magazine. Stange's personal style is influenced by Tokyo street fashion. Of her style, she says, "I like crazy, colorful clothes."

During Berlin Fashion Week, Iekeliene released a solo photography exhibit titled I Like Ponies.

References

External links

 
 Iekeliene Stange photos at Style.com
 Iekeliene Stange profile at Teen Vogue

1984 births
Living people
Dutch female models
Dutch photographers